W. G. Barlow was a Royal Flying Corps pilot during the First World War, a racing driver in the 1920s, and a fascist before and after the Second World War. He was detained by the British government under Defence Regulation 18B during the Second World War.

First World War
W. G. Barlow served in the Royal Flying Corps as a pilot during the First World War.

Motor racing
In the early 1920s, Barlow was a regular competitor at the Brooklands motor racing circuit. In 1920 he drove an ex-Tuck Humber in the August bank holiday event. In August 1922 he was pictured in a Bentley. In 1923, he competed in a Halford Special at least three times. He also raced an Aston Martin.

Fascism
Barlow joined Oswald Mosley's British Union of Fascists (BUF) sometime before the Second World War. During the war, he was one of those detained by the British government under the newly introduced Defence Regulation 18B.

After the end of the war, Barlow was a worshipper and the financial backer of the religious community known as Kingdom House, at River, West Sussex, where they worshiped Adolf Hitler as Christ returned. According to information given to Brian Simpson by Robert Row, the worshipers also included James Larratt Battersby, Captain Thomas Baker MC, and A.J. Schneider.

References

Further reading
"Humber mystery solved" by Bill Boddy in Motor Sport, April 2001, pp. 114–115.

External links

http://austinharris.co.uk/driver/w-g-barlow

British racing drivers
British fascists
Year of birth missing
Year of death missing
Royal Flying Corps officers
People detained under Defence Regulation 18B